Sitalkuchi College is a general degree college in Sitalkuchi, India. It is in Cooch Behar district. It offers undergraduate courses in arts. It is affiliated to  Cooch Behar Panchanan Barma University.

Departments

Arts

Bengali
English
History
Geography
Political Science
Philosophy
Arabic
Education 
Socieolozy 
Sanskrit

See also

References

External links 
 Sitalkuchi College

Colleges affiliated to Cooch Behar Panchanan Barma University
Academic institutions formerly affiliated with the University of North Bengal
Educational institutions established in 1999
Universities and colleges in Cooch Behar district
1999 establishments in West Bengal